Maximiliano Lombardi Rodríguez (born 11 May 1987 in Montevideo) is an Uruguayan professional footballer.

International career
Lombardi played the 2007 South American Youth Championship in Paraguay.

Honours
Cerro
 2009 Liguilla Pre-Libertadores de América

Guastatoya
2020 Apertura

External links
 Profile at Soccerway
 Stats at Footballdatabase.eu
 Profile at Ceroacero.es

1987 births
Living people
Footballers from Montevideo
Uruguayan footballers
Uruguay under-20 international footballers
Uruguayan expatriate footballers
Association football midfielders
C.A. Progreso players
C.A. Cerro players
Peñarol players
Boca Unidos footballers
Rosario Central footballers
F.C. Motagua players
El Tanque Sisley players
Los Caimanes footballers
C.A. Rentistas players
Central Español players
Cobán Imperial players
Comunicaciones F.C. players
Uruguayan Primera División players
Uruguayan Segunda División players
Primera Nacional players
Liga Nacional de Fútbol de Guatemala players
Liga Nacional de Fútbol Profesional de Honduras players
Peruvian Primera División players
Peruvian Segunda División players
Uruguayan expatriate sportspeople in Argentina
Uruguayan expatriate sportspeople in Honduras
Uruguayan expatriate sportspeople in Guatemala
Uruguayan expatriate sportspeople in Peru
Expatriate footballers in Argentina
Expatriate footballers in Honduras
Expatriate footballers in Guatemala
Expatriate footballers in Peru